The Maahunui volcanic field is an extinct basaltic submarine miocene monogenetic volcanic field off the east coast of the South Island of New Zealand to the south of the more recent Banks Peninsula Volcano.

Geology
Over 30 volcanic features including craters and cones have been described in the Maahunui Volcanic Field,  even although most are buried in up to  thickness of ocean sediment. These are intraplate small-volume single event volcanoes. A feature of the field is that it was always underwater, but some of the cones formed islands in the historic sea and then have been eroded with characteristic flattened tops. The eruptions occurred between 15.9 to 11 million years ago, mostly in the last 2 million years of this period. The resulting seamounts were finally all buried about the time that Banks Peninsula was formed in the late miocene. The detailed understanding of the field results from bore hole and seismic data accumulated over many years of geological mapping.

Name
The name Maahunui relates to the canoe of Maui which (according to Māori legend) became the South Island of New
Zealand. It is the term Māori use for the coast south of Banks Peninsula. It was so named after appropriate consultation in 2019.

References 

Monogenetic volcanic fields
Geography of Canterbury, New Zealand
Extinct volcanoes
Landforms of Canterbury, New Zealand
Volcanoes of Canterbury, New Zealand
Submarine volcanoes
Seamounts of New Zealand
Zealandia
Volcanism of New Zealand
Volcanoes of New Zealand